In the film and media industry, if a film released in theatres fails to break even by a large amount, it is considered a box-office bomb (or box-office flop), thus losing money for the distributor, studio, and/or production company that invested in it. Due to the secrecy surrounding costs and profit margins in the film industry, figures of losses are usually rough estimates at best, and there are often conflicting estimates over how much a film has lost. To accommodate this uncertainty, the losses are presented as ranges where this is the case, and the list is ordered alphabetically in the absence of a definitive order. Because the films on the list have been released over a large span of time, currency inflation is a material factor, so losses are adjusted for inflation using the United States Consumer Price Index to enable comparison at equivalent purchasing power.

Some films on this list grossed more than their production budgets yet are still regarded as flops. This can be due to Hollywood accounting practices that manipulate profits or keep costs secret to circumvent profit-sharing agreements, but it is also possible for films to lose money legitimately even when the theatrical gross exceeds the budget. This is because a distributor does not collect the full gross, and the full cost of a film can substantially exceed its production budget once distribution and marketing are taken into account. For example, tax filings in 2010 for Cinemark Theatres show that only 54.5 percent of ticket revenues went to the distributor, with the exhibitor retaining the rest. While the distributor's cut will vary from film to film, a Hollywood studio will typically collect half the gross in the United States and less in other parts of the world. Marketing often represents a substantial share of the overall cost of the picture too: for a film with an average sized budget the promotion and advertising costs are typically half that of the production budget, and in the case of smaller films it is not unusual for the cost of the marketing to be higher than the production budget. In some cases, a company can make profits from a box-office bomb when ancillary revenues are taken into account, such as streaming, home media sales and rentals, television broadcast rights, and licensing fees, so a film that loses money at the box office can still eventually break even.

There are some films notorious for large production budgets and widely seen as box-office bombs that have either broken even or turned a profit. It became the highest-grossing film of 1963, but still failed to recoup its investment during its theatrical release. However, it eventually broke even in 1966 when Fox sold the television broadcast rights to ABC for $5 million. The total costs for Waterworld (1995) exceeded $300 million and it was perceived as a disaster at the time, despite grossing $264 million worldwide. It also eventually broke even through other revenue streams. Such films are still cited as high-risk examples in evaluating the prospects of future productions. For example, Cleopatra is blamed for a decline in big-budget epic films in the 1960s.

The COVID-19 pandemic, starting around March 2020, caused temporary closure of movie theatres, and distributors moved several films to premier to streaming services such as HBO Max, Disney+, and Peacock with little to no box-office takes. While these films may have had successful runs on these services, the viewership or revenue from these showings are typically not reported and excluded from the box office. As a result, several films from 2020 to 2022 are included on this list, despite potentially having been profitable for their studios through streaming.

Biggest box-office bombs
The following is a partial list of films that lost the most money, based on documented losses or estimated by expert analysis of various financial factors such as the production budget, marketing and distribution costs, gross box-office receipts and other ancillary revenues. The list is limited to films that are potentially among the top one hundred box-office losses, adjusted for inflation (approximately upper-bound losses of $85 million or higher ).

§ indicates a film released for streaming less than 30 days after it was released theatrically.

See also

List of films considered the worst
Lists of highest-grossing films
List of highest-grossing films
List of commercial failures in video games

Notes

References

Chart sources

Bibliography

 
 
 

  
 
 
 
 
 

Lists of worsts
Lists of films
Film box office